Paul Nakauchi is an American actor known for voicing Hanzo Shimada in Overwatch (2016) and Shadowsan in Carmen Sandiego (2019).

Career
In the 1990s, he guest starred in Knots Landing, Star Trek: Deep Space Nine (in the episode "The Homecoming"), Batman: The Animated Series and ER.

He lent his voice to the video games Diablo III: Reaper of Souls, Call of Duty: World at War, Syphon Filter: The Omega Strain, Tomb Raider: Legend, World of Warcraft, Lost Planet 2, and Dead or Alive: Dimensions (as Gen Fu). His most productive role to date is in Overwatch as Hanzo Shimada. Nakauchi played Sgt. Shigeno in the motion picture, The Great Raid.

Nakauchi has also appeared in the Broadway musicals Chu Chem (1989) and The King and I (from 1996 to 1998). He starred in the Broadway Asia production of The King and I as King Phra Meha Mongkut. Nakauchi voiced the character "Hutch" in the animated comedy drama film, Alpha and Omega. He portrayed the Kralahome in Lincoln Center Theater's Broadway revival of Rodgers and Hammerstein's The King and I, directed by Bartlett Sher. He played the role of Watari in Adam Wingard's Death Note.

Filmography

Film

Television

Video games

References

External links

Living people
American male actors of Japanese descent
American male film actors
American male musical theatre actors
American male television actors
American male video game actors
American male voice actors
American film actors of Asian descent
20th-century American male actors
21st-century American male actors
American gay actors
1959 births